The Supercopa de España or the Spanish Super Cup is a super cup tournament in Spanish football. Founded in 1982 as a two-team competition, the current version has been contested since 2019–20 by four teams: the winners and runners-up of the Copa del Rey and La Liga. Barcelona are the defending champions.

History
The current competition has existed since 1982. Between 1940 and 1953, several other tournaments between the Spanish league champions and the cup winners (then Copa del Generalísimo) were played.

In September 1940, a match with this format had the name of Copa de Campeones. It was not repeated until December 1945 when, due to the good relations with the Spanish military government the ambassador of Argentina, offered a trophy called Copa de Oro Argentina. Both these trophies were unofficial and were only played once.

In 1941 the Copa Presidente FEF was established as an official tournament founded and organized by the RFEF; however, it was also only contested once, and though 11 of the 12 matches in its mini-league format were played between April and May 1941, its last, decisive fixture was delayed until eventually taking place in September 1947.

Also in 1947, the Copa Eva Duarte was established as an annual and official tournament founded and organized by the RFEF, as a tribute to Argentine president Juan Domingo Perón and his wife María Eva Duarte de Perón. It was played between September and December, usually as one-match finals. The trophy was the predecessor of the current Supercopa de España, first held in 1982.

In 2018, the Supercopa was played for the first time as a single match hosted at a neutral venue.

On 12 November 2019, it was announced that the Supercopa would expand to four teams, the winners and runners-up of the Copa del Rey and La Liga, and would be held at King Abdullah Sports City in Jeddah, Saudi Arabia for the next three years, in a deal valued at €120 million. The event was also moved to January in order to reduce the "congestion" on teams' schedules. The agreement has faced criticism: Jesus Alvarez, head of sport programming for state broadcaster RTVE, stated that it would not bid for the media rights to the Supercopa, in protest of Saudi Arabia's human and women's rights records—especially in women's sports. Liga Nacional de Fútbol Profesional president Javier Tebas also criticized the decision, citing the human rights violations and the country's "pirating" of European football (in reference to pirate broadcaster beoutQ). In the past, Tebas has been a major advocate to hold the competition outside of Spain, and especially the United States, as part of his efforts to expand La Liga globally. RSFF president Luis Rubiales stated that women would be able to attend the matches without restriction, and defended the agreement as the use of football to "transform society".

Neither the Copa del Rey nor La Liga winners reached the Supercopa de España final in the first three editions of the four-team format.

Predecessors of Supercopa

Early tournaments

Copa Eva Duarte

* In 1952 and 1953 the cup was awarded to Barcelona, as they had won the La Liga / Copa del Generalísimo double.

Finals by year

Two-team format
Except for the 1983, 1988 and 1992 tournaments, the first leg match was played at the cup winner's stadium.

Four-team format

Titles by club

Titles by club in Supercopa

Titles by club in predecessors of Supercopa

All-time top goalscorers

Bold indicates active players in Spanish football.

Individual records
 All-time top scorer: Lionel Messi has scored 14 goals.
 Most finals scored in: Lionel Messi has scored in 7 finals.

See also
 Football in Spain

References

External links

The predecessor of the current Supercopa de España

 
Spain
2
Recurring sporting events established in 1982
1982 establishments in Spain